The Journal of the Optical Society of America  is a peer-reviewed scientific journal of optics, published by Optica. It was established in 1917 and in 1984 was split into two parts, A and B.

Journal of the Optical Society of America A 
Part A covers various topics in optics, vision, and image science. The editor-in-chief is Olga Korotkova (University of Miami, USA).

Journal of the Optical Society of America B 
Part B covers various topics in the field of optical physics, such as guided waves, laser spectroscopy, nonlinear optics, quantum optics, lasers, organic and polymer materials for optics, and ultrafast phenomena. The editor-in-chief is Kurt Busch (Humboldt University of Berlin, Germany).

References

External links 
 Journal of the Optical Society of America A website
 Journal of the Optical Society of America B website

Publications established in 1917
Optica (society) academic journals
Optics journals
English-language journals
Monthly journals